La Tontouta International Airport, also known as Nouméa – La Tontouta International Airport is the main international airport in New Caledonia, and the military base for the French Air Force based in New-Caledonia. La Tontouta International Airport serves international flights, while Noumea Magenta Airport, located 38 km south-east within the city of Noumea, serves domestic flights. The airport is regularly served by four airlines, including Aircalin, which is based at the airport. In 2017, 529,349 passengers used the airport.

History

World War II
Tontouta Air Base was originally constructed by the United States Navy's Seabees for the Pacific Theater of the Second World War. The base had two runways numbered 3/21 and 11/29. The base reverted to local (French) control after the war and today's remaining runway is aligned on 11/29.

United States Army Air Forces units based here included:
64th Troop Carrier Squadron operating Douglas C-47 Skytrains in 1943.
67th Fighter Squadron operating Bell P-39 Airacobras from 17 March 1942 – 24 April 1943

United States Marine Corps units based here included:
VMF-212 operating Grumman F4F Wildcats
VMO-251 operating Grumman F4F Wildcats from June–August 1942

Terminal expansion

A major expansion of the airport's terminal was completed in 2012 after several years of work. The project resulted in a significant increase in the terminal's size and included a new arrivals area, a larger check-in area and the installation of two jetbridges. The terminal now has five stands capable of handling commercial jet aircraft, two of which are served by the new airbridges and three of which utilise stairs to access the aircraft. In addition, the airport has several more stands designed to handle smaller aircraft.

Airlines and destinations

Passenger

Cargo

Statistics

See also
Nouméa Magenta Airport, the domestic airport for Nouméa.

References

External links

Aéroport international de Nouméa - La Tontouta (official website) 
Aéroport de Nouméa - La Tontouta at L'Union des Aéroports Français 

Airports in New Caledonia
Buildings and structures in Nouméa
Airfields of the United States Army Air Forces in the Pacific Ocean theatre of World War II
Seabees